This was the first edition of the men's tournament.

Radu Albot won the title after defeating Miomir Kecmanović 6–2, 4–6, 6–3 in the final.

Seeds

Draw

Finals

Top half

Bottom half

References
Main Draw
Qualifying Draw

Liuzhou International Challenger - Men's Singles